Kamala Kumari Parajuli (born 24 July 1968) is a Nepali human rights activist and gender equality specialist who currently serves as Chairperson of the National Women Commission, one of the country's eight constitutional bodies. Appointed in December 2020 she previously worked with Sankalp, the Nepal Peace and Unity Council and the Sancharika Group.

References

Living people
1968 births